Switchyard may refer to:

 Railway switchyard
 Electrical substation